This page details the records, statistics and career achievements of American basketball player James Harden. Harden is an American basketball guard who plays for the Philadelphia 76ers of the National Basketball Association.

NBA career statistics

Regular season

|-
| style="text-align:left;"| 
| style="text-align:left;"| Oklahoma City
| 76 || 0 || 22.9 || .403 || .375 || .808 || 3.2 || 1.8 || 1.1 || .3 || 9.9
|-
| style="text-align:left;"| 
| style="text-align:left;"| Oklahoma City
|82 || 5 || 26.7 || .436 || .349 || .843 || 3.1 || 2.1 || 1.1 || .3 || 12.2
|-
| style="text-align:left;"| 
| style="text-align:left;"| Oklahoma City
| 62 || 2 || 31.4 || .491 || .390 || .846 || 4.1 || 3.7 || 1.0 || .2 || 16.8
|-
| style="text-align:left;"| 
| style="text-align:left;"| Houston
| 78 || 78 || 38.3 || .438 || .368 || .851 || 4.9 || 5.8 || 1.8 || .5 || 25.9
|-
| style="text-align:left;"| 
| style="text-align:left;"| Houston
| 73 || 73 || 38.0 || .456 || .366  || .866 || 4.7 || 6.1 || 1.6 || .4 || 25.4
|-
| style="text-align:left;"| 
| style="text-align:left;"| Houston
| 81 || 81 || 36.8 || .440 || .375 || .868 || 5.7 || 7.0 || 1.9 || .7 || 27.4
|-
| style="text-align:left;"| 
| style="text-align:left;"| Houston
|82 || 82 || style="background:#cfecec;"|38.1* || .439 || .359  || .860 || 6.1 || 7.5 || 1.7 || .6 || 29.0
|-
| style="text-align:left;"| 
| style="text-align:left;"| Houston
| 81 || 81 || 36.4 || .440 || .347  || .847 || 8.1 ||style="background:#cfecec;"| 11.2* || 1.5 || .5 || 29.1
|-
| style="text-align:left;"| 
| style="text-align:left;"| Houston
| 72 || 72 || 35.4 || .449 || .367  || .858 || 5.4 || 8.8 || 1.8 || .7 ||style="background:#cfecec;"| 30.4*
|-
| style="text-align:left;"| 
| style="text-align:left;"| Houston
| 78 || 78 || 36.8 || .442 || .368  || .879 || 6.6 || 7.5 || 2.0 || .7 ||style="background:#cfecec;"| 36.1*
|-
| style="text-align:left;"| 
| style="text-align:left;"| Houston
| 68 || 68 || 36.5 || .444 || .355 || .865 || 6.6 || 7.5 || 1.8 || .9 ||style="background:#cfecec;"| 34.3*
|-
| style="text-align:left;" rowspan="2"| 
| style="text-align:left;"| Houston
| 8 || 8 || 36.3 || .444 || .347 || .861 || 5.1 || 10.4 || 1.2 || .8 || 24.8
|-
| style="text-align:left;"| Brooklyn
| 36 || 36 || 36.3 || .471 || .366 || .856 || 8.5 || 10.9 || 1.3 || .8 || 24.6
|-
|- class="sortbottom"
| style="text-align:center;" colspan="2"| Career
| 877 || 663 || 34.4 || .444 || .363 || .858 || 5.5 || 6.5 || 1.6 || .5 || 25.1
|- class="sortbottom"
| style="text-align:center;" colspan="2"| All-Star
| 7 || 5 || 25.9 || .450 || .397 || .000 || 5.3 || 6.0 || .7 || .1 || 15.9

Playoffs

|-
| style="text-align:left;"| 2010
| style="text-align:left;"| Oklahoma City
| 6 || 0 || 20.0 || .387 || .375 || .842 || 2.5 || 1.8 || 1.0 || .2 || 7.7
|-
| style="text-align:left;"| 2011
| style="text-align:left;"| Oklahoma City
| 17 || 0 || 31.6 || .475 || .303 || .825 || 5.4 || 3.6 || 1.2 || .8 || 13.0
|-
| style="text-align:left;"| 2012
| style="text-align:left;"| Oklahoma City
| 20 || 0 || 31.5 || .435 || .410 || .857 || 5.1 || 3.4 || 1.6 || .1 || 16.3
|-
| style="text-align:left;"| 2013
| style="text-align:left;"| Houston
| 6 || 6 || 40.5 || .391 || .341 || .803 || 6.7 || 4.5 || 2.0 || 1.0 || 26.3
|-
| style="text-align:left;"| 2014
| style="text-align:left;"| Houston
| 6 || 6 || 43.8 || .376 || .296 || .900 || 4.7 || 5.8 || 2.0 || .2 || 26.8
|-
| style="text-align:left;"| 2015
| style="text-align:left;"| Houston
| 17 || 17 || 37.4 || .439 || .383 || .916 || 5.7 || 7.5 || 1.6 || .4 || 27.2
|-
| style="text-align:left;"| 2016
| style="text-align:left;"| Houston
| 5 || 5 || 38.6 || .410 || .310 || .844 || 5.2 || 7.6 || 2.4 || .2 || 26.6
|-
| style="text-align:left;"| 2017
| style="text-align:left;"| Houston
| 11 || 11 || 37.0 || .413 || .278 || .878 || 5.5 || 8.5 || 1.9 || .5 || 28.5
|-
| style="text-align:left;"| 2018
| style="text-align:left;"| Houston
| 17 || 17 || 36.5 || .410 || .299 || .887 || 5.2 || 6.8 || 2.2 || .6 || 28.6
|-
| style="text-align:left;"| 2019
| style="text-align:left;"| Houston
| 11 || 11 || 38.5 || .413 || .350 || .837 || 6.9 || 6.6 || 2.2 || .9 || 31.6
|-
| style="text-align:left;"| 2020
| style="text-align:left;"| Houston
| 12 || 12 || 37.3 || .478 || .333 || .845 || 5.6 || 7.7 || 1.5 || .8 || 29.6
|-
| style="text-align:left;"| 2021
| style="text-align:left;"| Brooklyn
| 9 || 9 || 35.8 || .472 || .364 || .903 || 6.3 || 8.6 || 1.7 || .7 || 20.2
|- class="sortbottom"
| style="text-align:center;" colspan="2"| Career
| 137 || 94 || 35.4 || .428 || .332 || .868 || 5.5 || 6.0 || 1.7 || .5 || 23.3

College

|-
| style="text-align:left;"| 2007–08
| style="text-align:left;"| Arizona State
| 34 || 33 || 34.1 || .527 || .407 || .754 || 5.3 || 3.2 || 2.1 || .6 || 17.8
|-
| style="text-align:left;"| 2008–09
| style="text-align:left;"| Arizona State
| 35 || 35 || 35.8 || .489 || .356 || .756 || 5.6 || 4.2 || 1.7 || .3 || 20.1
|- class="sortbottom"
| style="text-align:center;" colspan="2"| Career
| 69 || 68 || 35.0 || .506 || .376 || .755 || 5.4 || 3.7 || 1.9 || .4 || 19.0

Awards and achievements

NBA 
 7x All-NBA selection:
 First team: 2014, 2015, 2017, 2018, 2019, 2020
 Third team: 2013
 10x NBA All-Star: 2013, 2014, 2015, 2016, 2017, 2018, 2019,  2020, 2021, 2022
 NBA All-Rookie selection:
 Second team: 2010
 NBA Sixth Man of the Year: 2012
 NBA Most Valuable Player: 2018
 2x NBA minutes leader: 2015, 2016
 1x NBA assists leader: 2017
 3x NBA scoring leader: 2018, 2019, 2020
 3× NBA three-point field goals leader: 2018, 2019, 2020

United States National Team 
 Olympic medalist:
 Gold: 2012
 FIBA World Championship medalist:
 Gold: 2014

College 
 Pac-10 Player of the Year: 2009
 2× First-team All-Pac-10: 2008, 2009
 No. 13 retired by Arizona State
 Teen Choice Award for Choice Male Athlete (2019)

NBA achievements 

 “NBA record for most turnovers in a playoff game, with 13 total against the Golden State Warriors in 2015.”
 Holds record for most turnovers in a single season, Harden also owns 2nd and 4th place in this particular stat.
 First player in NBA history to record 60-point triple-double (60 points, 11 assists and 10 rebounds).
 Only player in NBA history to record a 40-point triple-double while playing less than thirty minutes. He recorded 43 points, 12 assists, and 10 rebounds in 29 minutes 34 seconds of playtime in a victory over the Cleveland Cavaliers. (1/11/19)
 Only player in NBA history to score at least 30 points against all other teams in the NBA within a single season.
 Only player in 2017-2018 to score over 35 points 15 times.
 Only player in NBA history to make at least 200 three-pointers and 700 free throws in a single season. (has achieved this twice)
 Only player in NBA history to record at least 34 points and 17 assists in a season opener.
 Only player in NBA history to record at least 60 points, 25 assists, and 15 rebounds through his first two games this season.
 Only player in NBA history to record at least 50 points, 15 rebounds, 15 assists in a game.
 Only player in NBA history to record at least 51 points, 12 rebounds, 5 steals in a game.
 Only player in NBA history to record at least 10 three-pointers and 9 assists in a game.
 Only player in NBA history to record at least 5 three-pointers, 8 two-pointers, 22 free throws in a game.
  Only player in NBA history to record a 30-point triple-double in his first game for a franchise.
 One of two players in NBA history known to have been responsible for 90 or more points, including points and assists, in a game, and the only one to have accomplished this feat more than once (twice to date).
 Includes Wilt Chamberlain, whose only known accomplishment of this nature was his 100-point game in 1962.
 One of two players in NBA history to record at least 50 points, 10 rebounds, 10 assists in a game twice in one season.
Includes Russell Westbrook.
 Only player in NBA history to record at least 2,000 points, 900 assists, and 600 rebounds in a single season.
 One of three players in NBA history to average at least 25 points and 5 assists in first 4 seasons with a team.
 Includes Oscar Robertson and LeBron James.
 One of five players in NBA history to average at least 29 points, 7 assists, 6 rebounds in a single season.
 Includes Oscar Robertson (achieved this seven times), LeBron James (achieved this twice), Michael Jordan, and Russell Westbrook.
 One of four players in NBA history to score at least 30 points in each of his first two road games played for a franchise.
 Includes Wilt Chamberlain, Terry Dischinger, and Kevin Durant.
 One of four players in NBA history to record at least 2,000 points and 600 assists in a single season twice.
 Includes Oscar Robertson (achieved this seven times), John Havlicek, and Tiny Archibald.

References 

Harden, James
Harden, James
Houston Rockets
Oklahoma City Thunder